Kenneth Wayne Martin (born 28 April 1953) is a New Zealand cricketer. He played in 16 first-class and 19 List A matches for Central Districts from 1984 to 1988.

See also
 List of Central Districts representative cricketers

References

External links
 

1953 births
Living people
New Zealand cricketers
Central Districts cricketers
Cricketers from New Plymouth